The 2002 Barnsley Metropolitan Borough Council election took place on 2 May 2002 to elect members of Barnsley Metropolitan Borough Council in South Yorkshire, England. One third of the council was up for election and the Labour party stayed in overall control of the council.

Election result
The results saw Labour keep a large majority despite losing seats to independents. Overall turnout in the election was 26%.

This resulted in the following composition of the council:

Ward results

+/- figures represent changes from the last time these wards were contested.

References

2002 English local elections
2002
2000s in South Yorkshire